Anthrenus coloratus is a species in the family Dermestidae ("carpet beetles"), in the order Coleoptera ("beetles"). The species is known generally as the "Asian carpet beetle".
It is found in North America.

References

Further reading
 Arnett, R.H. Jr., M. C. Thomas, P. E. Skelley and J. H. Frank. (eds.). (2002). American Beetles, Volume II: Polyphaga: Scarabaeoidea through Curculionoidea. CRC Press LLC, Boca Raton, FL.
 Beal, R. S. Jr. (2003). "Annotated Checklist of Nearctic Dermestidae with Revised Key to the Genera". The Coleopterists Bulletin, vol. 57, no. 4, 391–404.
 Richard E. White. (1983). Peterson Field Guides: Beetles. Houghton Mifflin Company.
 Ross H. Arnett. (2000). American Insects: A Handbook of the Insects of America North of Mexico. CRC Press.

Anthrenus
Beetles described in 1881